Faisz Musthapha is a Sri Lankan lawyer and diplomat.

Early life and family
Musthapha is the son of S. M. Musthapha, a leading lawyer who practised in Kandy. He was educated at the University of Ceylon.

Musthapha is married to Ameena (Fathima). Their son Faiszer is a lawyer and government minister whilst their daughter Faisza is also a lawyer.

Career
Musthapha has been practising law since the mid 1960s and is a President's Counsel. He served as chairman of the 
Human Rights Commission of Sri Lanka between 2000 and 2003.

Musthapha served as High Commissioner to the United Kingdom between April 2002 and February 2005.

See also 
Sri Lankan Non Career Diplomats

References

Alumni of the University of Ceylon
High Commissioners of Sri Lanka to the United Kingdom
Living people
President's Counsels (Sri Lanka)
Sri Lankan Moor lawyers
Sri Lankan Muslims
Year of birth missing (living people)